Saluda County is a county in the U.S. state of South Carolina. As of the 2020 census, the population was 18,862. Its county seat is Saluda. The county was formed from northern and eastern portions of Edgefield County.

Saluda County is part of the Columbia, SC Metropolitan Area.

Geography

Saluda County is largely in the Saluda River basin with a small portion of western Saluda in the Savannah River basin.

National protected area
 Sumter National Forest (part)

Major water bodies 
 Halfway Swamp Creek
 Lake Murray
 Saluda River

Adjacent Counties 
 Newberry County - north
 Lexington County - east
 Aiken County - south
 Edgefield County - southwest
 Greenwood County - northwest
 McCormick County - west

Major highways

Major infrastructure 
 Saluda County Airport

Demographics

2020 census

As of the 2020 United States census, there were 18,862 people, 7,094 households, and 5,132 families residing in the county.

2010 census
As of the 2010 United States Census, there were 19,875 people, 7,527 households, and 5,393 families living in the county. The racial makeup of the county was 61.1% white, 26.3% black or African American, 0.4% American Indian, 0.3% Pacific islander, 0.2% Asian, 10.3% from other races, and 1.4% from two or more races. Those of Hispanic or Latino origin made up 14.4% of the population. In terms of ancestry, 17.8% were American, 14.7% were German, 8.6% were English, and 8.2% were Irish.

Of the 7,527 households, 32.5% had children under the age of 18 living with them, 50.6% were married couples living together, 15.0% had a female householder with no husband present, 28.4% were non-families, and 24.2% of all households were made up of individuals. The average household size was 2.61 and the average family size was 3.05. The median age was 39.6 years.

The median income for a household in the county was $40,508 and the median income for a family was $45,173. Males had a median income of $31,264 versus $28,344 for females. The per capita income for the county was $18,717. About 11.7% of families and 15.1% of the population were below the poverty line, including 19.4% of those under age 18 and 15.0% of those age 65 or over.

2000 census
As of the census of 2000, there were 19,181 people, 7,127 households, and 5,295 families living in the county.  The population density was 42 people per square mile (16/km2).  There were 8,543 housing units at an average density of 19 per square mile (7/km2).  The racial makeup of the county was 65.80% White, 29.99% Black or African American, 0.23% Native American, 0.04% Asian, 0.01% Pacific Islander, 3.29% from other races, and 0.64% from two or more races.  7.30% of the population were Hispanic or Latino of any race.

There were 7,127 households, out of which 31.80% had children under the age of 18 living with them, 54.20% were married couples living together, 14.50% had a female householder with no husband present, and 25.70% were non-families. 22.50% of all households were made up of individuals, and 10.40% had someone living alone who was 65 years of age or older.  The average household size was 2.65 and the average family size was 3.07.

In the county, the population was spread out, with 24.90% under the age of 18, 9.20% from 18 to 24, 27.60% from 25 to 44, 23.80% from 45 to 64, and 14.50% who were 65 years of age or older.  The median age was 37 years. For every 100 females there were 98.60 males.  For every 100 females age 18 and over, there were 95.30 males.

The median income for a household in the county was $35,774, and the median income for a family was $41,603. Males had a median income of $29,221 versus $21,395 for females. The per capita income for the county was $16,328.  About 12.00% of families and 15.60% of the population were below the poverty line, including 21.40% of those under age 18 and 16.30% of those age 65 or over.

Law and government

Law enforcement
In 2012, Saluda County Sheriff Jason Booth pled guilty to charges of misuse of office after using an inmate to make improvements at his home.

Politics

Communities

Towns
 Batesburg-Leesville (mostly in Lexington County)
 Monetta (mostly in Aiken County)
 Ridge Spring
 Saluda (county seat and largest town)
 Ward

Unincorporated communities
 Mount Willing

Notable people
 William B. Travis, A Texas Lt. Colonel leading defense in The Battle of the Alamo.

See also 
 List of counties in South Carolina
 National Register of Historic Places listings in Saluda County, South Carolina
 List of national forests of the United States

References

External links

 
 
 Saluda County Chamber of Commerce

 
South Carolina placenames of Native American origin
1896 establishments in South Carolina
Populated places established in 1896